Mariko Mori (森 万里子 Mori Mariko, born June 17, 1981) is a Japanese volleyball player who plays for Toray Arrows. She served as sub captain of the team between 2008 and 2010. Her maiden name was Mariko Nishiwaki.

Clubs
 Osaka Shitennouji high school
 Toyobo Orkis (2000–2002)
 Toray Arrows (2002-2012)

Awards

Individuals
2006-07 V.Premier League - Spike awards
2008-09 V.Premier League - Spike awards, Best6

Team
2004 Kurowashiki All Japan Volleyball Championship -  Champion, with Toray Arrows
2007 Domestic Sports Festival (Volleyball) -  Champion, with Toray Arrows
2007-2008 Empress's Cup -   Champion, with Toray Arrows
2007-2008 V.Premier League -  Champion, with Toray Arrows
2008 Domestic Sports Festival -  Runner-Up, with Toray Arrows
2008-2009 V.Premier League -  Champion, with Toray Arrows
2009 Kurowashiki All Japan Volleyball Championship -  Champion, with Toray Arrows
2009-2010 V.Premier League -  Champion, with Toray Arrows
2010 Kurowashiki All Japan Volleyball Championship -  Champion, with Toray Arrows
2010-11 V.Premier League -  Runner-up, with Toray Arrows

National team
2008 World Grand Prix2008

References

External links
FIVB biography
Toray Arrows Women's Volleyball Team

1981 births
Living people
Sportspeople from Osaka
Japanese women's volleyball players
Volleyball players at the 2010 Asian Games
Asian Games competitors for Japan